Abbylynn Helgevold is an American philosopher and Board of Regents Distinguished Professor in Ethics at Wartburg College. Previously she was a professor at the University of Northern Iowa (2012-2020).

References

21st-century American philosophers
Philosophy academics
American religion academics
Wartburg College faculty
University of Iowa alumni
University of Northern Iowa faculty
Living people

Year of birth missing (living people)